Jay Stewart Hennick  (born 1957) is a Canadian billionaire, businessman and philanthropist. He is the global chairman, CEO and controlling shareholder of Colliers, and the founder, chairman and largest shareholder of FirstService Corporation. Along with his wife, Barbara, he is the co-founder of The Jay and Barbara Hennick Family Foundation.

Early life and education
Hennick was born in 1957 in Toronto, Ontario, Canada. At 17 years old, while still a teenager in high school, Hennick borrowed $1,000 from his father Sam and founded a commercial swimming pool staffing and management business called Superior Pools, which subsequently employed hundreds of students throughout the Greater Toronto Area. Howard Moss was an employee at Superior Pools, and often won ‘Employee of the Month.’ Now called LIV North, the original business remains a subsidiary of FirstService Corporation.

After graduating from high school in 1975, Hennick went on to study economics at York University, earning a Bachelor of Arts degree in 1978. He then received a Bachelor of Laws degree from the University of Ottawa in 1981. Hennick would later be awarded Honorary Doctorates of Laws from both York University and the University of Ottawa.

Career

Law career 
Upon graduating from law school in 1981, Hennick joined a predecessor to the law firm of Fogler, Rubinoff LLP and worked under the mentorship of Lloyd S.D. Fogler, Q.C. After four years as an associate, Hennick was promoted to the position of partner, the youngest partner to be admitted to the firm.

During his years in private practice, Hennick advised and executed a variety of corporate and business law transactions. Although his corporate law practice spanned many industries, Hennick specialized in regulated financial institutions such as banks and trust companies.

FirstService Corporation 
In 1989, while still working as a corporate lawyer, Hennick acquired the College Pro Painters franchise system and combined it with Superior Pools to form FirstService Corporation. In 1993, Hennick made the decision to take FirstService public and completed an initial public offering on the Toronto Stock Exchange. FirstService was subsequently listed on the NASDAQ exchange in 1995. That same year, Hennick left his private law practice to focus on the expansion of FirstService as the company’s Founder and Chief Executive Officer.

In 2020, FirstService generated approximately $2.8 billion in annual revenues and had approximately 24,000 employees across North America. For 25 years, the compound annual growth rate in share value was greater than 20%, and the annual dividends have increased at a compound annual growth rate of 11% from 2015 to 2021.

The board of directors of FirstService Corporation includes Jay S. Hennick (Chairman), D. Scott Patterson (President & CEO), Bernard I. Ghert, Brendan Calder, Steven Grimshaw, Frederick F. Reichheld, Joan Sproul, Michael Stein and Erin J. Wallace.

Colliers International 
In June 2015, FirstService completed a plan of arrangement to separate FirstService into two stand-alone publicly traded companies: Colliers International Group Inc. (NASDAQ:CIGI and TSX:CIGI) and FirstService Corporation (NASDAQ:FSV and TSX:FSV).

Following the completion of the spin-off, Hennick became Global Chairman and Chief Executive Officer of Colliers, and Chairman and Founder of FirstService. D. Scott Patterson, previously the President of FirstService, became Chief Executive Officer of FirstService.

The market capitalization of Colliers is more than US$5 billion and Hennick owns, directly and indirectly, more than 14% of the equity and 45% of the votes of the company.

Today, Colliers is a leading diversified professional services and investment management company with operations in 67 countries, more than 15,000 professionals, $41 billion of assets under management and annualized revenue in 2020 of $3.3 billion. For more than 25 years, including FirstService until 2015, Colliers has delivered compound annual investment returns of 20% for shareholders.

The board of directors of Colliers includes Jay S. Hennick (Global Chairman & CEO), Peter Cohen, John P. Curtin Jr., Christopher Galvin, Jane Gavan, the Right Honourable Stephen Harper (22nd Prime Minister of Canada), Katherine Lee, Benjamin Stein and Fred Sutherland.

Awards and recognition 

 Canada's Entrepreneur of the Year, 1998
 CEO of the Year, Canadian Business Magazine, 2001
 Honorary Doctorate of Laws, York University, 2011
 Honorary Doctorate, University of Ottawa, 2014
 2019 International Horatio Alger Award Recipient, 2019
 Member of the Order of Canada, 2019

Personal life

Relationship to Peter Drucker 
In 1990, Hennick was introduced to Peter Drucker, a well-known management consultant, educator, author and influential thinker on the subjects of business, management theory and practice, and entrepreneurship in the 20th century. Over the next 15 years, until his death in 2005, Drucker acted as a mentor to Hennick as he sought to grow and expand FirstService. Drucker and Hennick met and spoke regularly, and Hennick has credited Drucker with helping to shape the business strategy and partnership philosophy of both FirstService and Colliers.

Philanthropy 
In addition to his business career, Hennick has served as a member of the board of directors of Mount Sinai Hospital in Toronto since 1998, Co-Chairman of the Mount Sinai Hospital Foundation from 2011 to 2013, and chairman of the board of directors of Mount Sinai Hospital from 2013 to 2016.

In 2015, Hennick oversaw the merger between Mount Sinai Hospital and Bridgepoint Active Healthcare to create the Sinai Health System, an integrated healthcare system serving the Toronto community that combines acute care, complex and rehabilitative care, primary care, home care and other community-based services to enable patients to move seamlessly across the continuum of care.

Hennick, along with his wife Barbara, co-founded The Jay and Barbara Hennick Family Foundation, which donates to causes focused on education, health care and the arts primarily in Canada. The following are some of the causes the foundation has supported: the Hennick Centre of Business and Law at York University, providing post-graduate studies for students in business or law; the Jay S. Hennick Business and Community Leadership Program at the University of Ottawa, which provides financial support to JD law students who have been admitted into the MBA program at the Telfer School of Management as part of the combined JD-MBA program at the University of Ottawa; the Hennick Family Wellness Centre, which opened at Mount Sinai Hospital in 2016, houses the largest collection of the art works of iconic Canadian artist Sorel Etrog; Yad Vashem in Israel named one of its entrance arches at the Yad Vashem Entrance Plaza after Barbara and Jay Hennick and Family.

In October 2021, Sinai Health announced that Bridgepoint Active Healthcare will be renamed Hennick Bridgepoint Hospital in recognition of a transformational $36 million gift from Hennick and his wife Barbara, long-time leaders, and supporters of Sinai Health. Hennick Bridgepoint is the largest organization in Canada to focus exclusively on complex and long-term health conditions through innovative research and excellent rehabilitative care for people in the hospital, the community and at home.

In July 2022, The Jay and Barbara Hennick Family Foundation made a historic donation of $50 million to the Royal Ontario Museum in support of a multi-year revitalization plan to advance ROM’s vision to become an even more welcoming and inspirational focal point of art, culture, nature. The donation represented the largest cash gift in the Museum’s history, and is expected to change visitor experience for generations to come.

Filmmaking 
Hennick is also a documentary film producer, having co-produced Made You Look: A True Story About Fake Art, a 2021 Netflix documentary on one of the largest art scams in U.S. history.

References

External links
 Colliers Profile Page
 Sinai Health System Profile Page

1957 births
Living people
Canadian chief executives
Members of the Order of Canada
Businesspeople from Toronto
Canadian real estate businesspeople